Giti Tire is a Singapore headquartered tire company, with eight manufacturing facilities, more than 32,000 global employees, and distribution to a market of more than 130 countries.

As of 2022, Giti is ranked as the #10 tire manufacturing company in the world based on revenue.

History

Giti Tire's roots go back to 1951, beginning with bicycle tire and inner-tube manufacturing in Indonesia, and later producing bias tires for passenger and commercial vehicles. The company entered China in 1993 and established a joint venture with Anhui Tire Factory, an independent third party for the production of bias tires. In 1998, Giti established proprietary sales and distribution centers in various locations, completing manufacturing facilities in Fujian two years later to serve new passenger car tire (PCR) production. Since then, the company has expanded further internationally, opening offices and distribution centers around the world.

In June 2014, the company announced plans to build a US$560 million production plant in South Carolina, USA, its first factory outside of Asia, which opened in October 2017.

In February 2016, Giti was named Automotive Supplier of the Year and Hardlines Supplier of the Year by Walmart USA.

Facts and Figures

 2018 Revenue: USD $3.2 billion, including affiliate PT Gajah Tunggal Tbk''
 Markets Present: more than 130 countries
 Regional Offices: United States, Canada, UK, Germany, France, Indonesia, China, U.A.E., Malaysia, and Singapore
 Research and Development: Locations in the US, Germany, UK, Indonesia, and China. Proving grounds in five different locations (Ding Yuan Proving Ground  in China, Mira Proving Ground in the UK, Mella Track Proving Ground in Finland, ARTC in Taiwan, and in Karawang, Indonesia.
 Manufacturing Facilities: Five plants located in China, Indonesia, and in South Carolina, USA. All plants have obtained ISO/TS16949:2002 accreditation (a standard of quality control and ISO14001 for Environmental Management System).

Motorsports

Giti sponsors motorsports drivers and events under the Giti and GT Radial brands. Included among these are being the tire sponsor for many Motorsports events in Asia and Europe, including the F3 Asian Championship

In 2017, Giti Tire debuted at the 24 Hours Nürburgring Race in Germany, qualifying 1st in the SP8 class, and placing 2nd in its class after a final race mechanical issue on the transmission. In 2019, the company achieved its best performance yet, with a first and second-place finish in the SP8 class at the 24 Hours Nürburgring. In addition, its 'Giti's Angels' team of all-female drivers, technicians, and coach achieved a first class finish in their group at the final VLN race in 2019.

In the UK, Giti is the official tire of the VW Beetle Fun Cup, using GitiCompete GTR1 tires.

GT Radial is a tire supplier to drifting competitors such as Chris Forsberg (Formula D; since 2021), Benjamin Bourdet (European Champion), and the German drift team.

In the United States, Giti has sponsored Japan's Nobuhiro Tajima in the Pikes Peak International Hill Climb Championship, the 2013 winner in the Electric Auto division.

In 2023 Giti is the official supplier of the Formula Regional Middle East championship.

Brand Portfolio

Giti Tire manufactures a variety of brands of passenger car, truck/bus, and off-road tires for global markets, which include Giti, GT Radial, Primewell, Runway, and Dextero.

References

Automotive companies established in 1951
1951 establishments in Singapore
Tire manufacturers of Singapore
Singaporean brands